A Zantop Air Transport Douglas DC-4 was on its final approach to Greater Cincinnati Airport runway 18 (now runway 18C), when it clipped some trees and crashed into a wooded area north of the airport. This was the first of at least three aircraft on their final approach that failed to reach runway 18 at the Greater Cincinnati Airport, becoming victims of the area's hilly terrain with steep changes in elevation from the Ohio River, the others being American Airlines Flight 383 and TWA Flight 128.

Crash
The pilot, Calvin Goutier, the co-pilot, Richard Breathren, and the unnamed flight engineer were flying from Detroit, Michigan, carrying automotive parts for General Motors Corporation to the airport for a routine landing while en route to Atlanta, Georgia. In the crash the fuselage broke into two pieces and the wreckage was strewn along a 400-foot (122-m) path. The crash occurred about 5:26 a.m.

The plane had been tracked by radar and suddenly disappeared from the radar screen, and airport authorities saw a large flash.

The crew exited through an escape hatch, surviving with minor injuries (Goutier a sprained ankle and Breathren a leg injury). A passing motorist, who worked for Delta Air Lines, noted a person walking out of the woods and continued driving to the airport. Later, Delta employees picked up the crew members.

Aircraft
The DC-4 aircraft involved was originally a United States Army Air Forces Douglas Skymaster, s/n 42-72226, which had been re-purchased by Douglas Aircraft Company on October 1, 1945, and reconfigured into a DC-4. On January 9, 1946, it was sold to United Airlines bearing US registration number N30061. United leased the airliner to Slick Airways on June 20, 1956. On June 4, 1959, it was sold to Lockheed Aircraft Corporation, who leased it back to Slick Airways until June 1960. Zantop Air Transport bought the aircraft in June 1960 and operated it as a cargo plane until it crashed.

References

External links
 

Aviation accidents and incidents in the United States in 1961
Cincinnati Zantop Dc-4 Crash, 1961
Airliner accidents and incidents in Kentucky
Airliner accidents and incidents caused by pilot error
Zantop Air Transport accidents and incidents
Cincinnati/Northern Kentucky International Airport
November 1961 events in the United States
Accidents and incidents involving the Douglas DC-4